This is a list of events from British radio in 1960.

Events
 13 July – The Pilkington Committee on Broadcasting is established to consider the future of broadcasting.

Programme debuts
 January – Easy Beat on the BBC Light Programme (1960–1967)
 20 September – Farming Today on BBC Network Three (1960–Present)

Endings
 28 January – The Goon Show (1951–1960)
 February – Educating Archie (1950–1960)
 3 March – Take It from Here (1948–1960)
 17 September – In Town Tonight (1933–1960)

Continuing radio programmes

1940s
 Music While You Work (1940–1967)
 Sunday Half Hour (1940–2018)
 Desert Island Discs (1942–Present)
 Family Favourites (1945–1980)
 Down Your Way (1946–1992)
 Have A Go (1946–1967)
 Housewives' Choice (1946–1967)
 Letter from America (1946–2004)
 Woman's Hour (1946–Present)
 Twenty Questions (1947–1976)
 Any Questions? (1948–Present)
 Mrs Dale's Diary (1948–1969)
 Billy Cotton Band Show (1949–1968)
 A Book at Bedtime (1949–Present)
 Ray's a Laugh (1949–1961)

1950s
 The Archers (1950–Present)
 Listen with Mother (1950–1982)
 From Our Own Correspondent (1955–Present)
 Pick of the Pops (1955–Present)
 The Clitheroe Kid (1957–1972)
 My Word! (1957–1988)
 Test Match Special (1957–Present)
 The Today Programme (1957–Present)
 The Navy Lark (1959–1977)
 Sing Something Simple (1959–2001)
 Your Hundred Best Tunes (1959–2007)

Births
 February – Lesley Riddoch, Scottish political journalist and broadcaster
 6 February – Harry Thompson, comedy producer (died 2005)
 10 March – Anne MacKenzie, Scottish broadcast journalist
 10 April – Katrina Leskanich, singer and musician, presenter on BBC Radio 2 (1998–2000)
 13 May – Sheila McClennon, presenter
 29 June – Charles Nove, presenter
 30 July – Pete Tong, disc jockey
 25 August – Dotun Adebayo, Nigerian-born broadcaster, writer and publisher
 12 September – Felicity Montagu, comedy actress
 17 November – Jonathan Ross, broadcast presenter
 Graham Torrington, disc jockey

Deaths
 7 May – Mai Jones, Welsh songwriter and radio producer (born 1899)
 16 November – Gilbert Harding, broadcast personality (born 1907) (asthma attack outside Broadcasting House)

See also 
 1960 in British music
 1960 in British television
 1960 in the United Kingdom
 List of British films of 1960

References 

 
Years in British radio
Radio